Wass is a village in the Ryedale district of North Yorkshire, England, in the North York Moors National Park.  A short distance from the village lie the ruins of Byland Abbey.  Despite the small size of the village (population about 100) there is a pub, the Stapylton Arms. It is at the foot of Wass Bank and has views of the surrounding countryside.

The toponym probably means 'fords', from Middle English wathes and ultimately from Old Norse vath.  The village is at the junction of several small streams. Another suggestion is that the name derives from the Old English Wæsse, meaning swamp.

To the east of the village is Wass Grange, in which building the monks of Byland Abbey stored their grain before the Dissolution of the Monasteries.  In May 2009 the nuns of Stanbrook Abbey, in Worcestershire, re-established themselves in a purpose-built convent near Wass.

References

External links

 

Villages in North Yorkshire
Ryedale